Czarnowiec may refer to the following places:
Czarnowiec, Ostrołęka County in Masovian Voivodeship (east-central Poland)
Czarnowiec, Otwock County in Masovian Voivodeship (east-central Poland)
Czarnowiec, Warmian-Masurian Voivodeship (north Poland)
Czarnowiec, West Pomeranian Voivodeship (north-west Poland)